The following television stations operate on virtual channel 8 in Canada:

 CBNT-DT in St. John's, Newfoundland and Labrador
 CFQC-DT in Saskatoon, Saskatchewan
 CFYK-DT in Yellowknife, Northwest Territories
 CHAN-DT in Vancouver, British Columbia
 CHEM-DT in Trois-Rivières, Quebec
 CIHF-DT in Halifax, Nova Scotia
 CIVA-DT-1 in Rouyn-Noranda, Quebec
 CIVV-DT in Saguenay, Quebec
 CKCW-DT-1 in Charlottetown, Prince Edward Island

08 virtual TV stations in Canada